Nelly Bodenheim or Johanna Cornelia Hermana Van Bodenheim (27 May 1874 – 7 January 1951) was a Dutch illustrator known for her silhouettes.

Bodenheim was born in Amsterdam where she was trained at the Rijksacademie voor Beeldende Kunsten in Amsterdam, and then she followed lessons from the painter Jan Veth. Her illustrations (often for children's books) were generally black & white silhouettes but she is also known for color lithography. Besides illustrations for books and magazines, she designed textiles, posters, and book covers. She was a member of the group of artists known as the Amsterdamse Joffers.

Her silhouettes decorated the 1905 book Women Painters of the World. Bodenheim's work was included in the 1939 exhibition and sale Onze Kunst van Heden (Our Art of Today) at the Rijksmuseum in Amsterdam.

References

1874 births
1951 deaths
Painters from Amsterdam
Dutch women painters
20th-century Dutch painters
20th-century Dutch women artists
19th-century Dutch women artists